Republican period may refer to many periods in several nations, including:

 The Roman Republic.
 The French Republic.
 Republican China.
 Any of several periods in the United States where the Republican Party controlled the federal government, or within individual US states or local governments when Republicans controlled those governments.